Cape Lollo (Norwegian: Kapp Lollo), located at , is a cape which forms the northeastern extremity of Bouvetøya in Norway. It was first charted in 1898 by a German expedition under Carl Chun, and was recharted and named in December 1927 by a Norwegian expedition under Captain Harald Horntvedt.

See also
Spiess Rocks

References

Headlands of Bouvet Island